Planet Zoo is a 2019 construction and management simulation video game by Frontier Developments for Microsoft Windows. The game is a spiritual successor to Zoo Tycoon and Zoo Tycoon 2, with gameplay similar to the studio's theme park game, Planet Coaster.

As with Planet Coaster, critics praised Planet Zoo creation tools along with its realistic animal portrayals and emphasis on wildlife conservation. However, the game was also criticized for the complexity of its management and building mechanics, which were deemed to be overly challenging for some players. Planet Zoo has received several downloadable content packs adding more animals. The game sold more than a million copies in six months.

Gameplay

Planet Zoo tasks players with building a zoo, with animal species in the base game and new species available through sixteen separate downloadable content packs and the Deluxe Edition. Animals, controlled by artificial intelligence, behave similarly to their real-life counterparts. For instance, wolves adopt a pack mentality and animals of the African plains (such as elephants, giraffe, zebras, wildebeest, and buffalo) can live together in a single mixed-species habitat. Each species has its own requirements and needs that players must satisfy through creation of a suitable exhibit environment and adequate behavioral enrichment. Predators can attack and kill other animals, but unlike in Zoo Tycoon, cannot attack guests. Each animal has their own genome within the game's breeding system, which reflect its life expectancy, size, health, and fertility and can be passed down through offspring. As such, elements such as inbreeding may have negative consequences on progeny.

In addition to ensuring animal welfare, the player must deal with managing the park as an institution. This includes hiring staff, constructing guest amenities and staff facilities, performing research, and working towards the conservation of threatened and endangered species. Like Planet Coaster, Planet Zoo provides over a thousand building pieces such as benches, lighting, flowers, trees, and items such as individual planks of wood, glass, rocks, and roof tiles. By allowing these items to phase-into and/or lock with each other, the creative player can create elaborate buildings, landscaping, and natural structures such as waterfalls and cave systems from scratch. Custom structures can be uploaded as "blueprints" for other players to download for free and place in their own zoos via the Steam Workshop. Safari, boat, train, monorail, and gondola lift rides can also be constructed throughout the zoo for transportation and to offer guests additional ways of viewing animals. The game features a dynamic day/night cycle, weather patterns, and animal poop physics.

The game features four modes: sandbox, career, challenge, and the online franchise mode. The franchise mode allows the player to build multiple franchise zoos with a shared economy and animals. Animals can be purchased and traded with other players' zoos through an online marketplace. Regular cooperative online community challenges focused on conservation (such as breeding and releasing as many giant pandas to the wild within a certain timeframe) allow players to receive "conservation credits," which can be redeemed for new animals instead of regular in-game currency. The game features ten critically endangered animal species and subspecies: the Bornean orangutan, Chinese pangolin, gharial, Himalayan brown bear, Lehmann's poison frog, Lesser Antillean iguana, red ruffed lemur, West African lion, western chimpanzee, and western lowland gorilla. Increasing the zoo's conservation rating through the display and release of endangered animals, informational signs, and educational talks is an important gameplay goal.

Development and release
The game was announced on 24 April 2019 and released on 5 November 2019. Its release was highly anticipated by many fans of the original Zoo Tycoon series who were disappointed by the significant changes to the 2013 reboot. Besides pre-ordering the game, players had the opportunity to pre-order the Deluxe Edition, which includes three exclusive animals (pygmy hippopotamus, Komodo dragon, and Thomson's gazelle) and other bonus content (such as wallpapers) and provided beta access a few weeks before release.

Twelve additional paid downloadable content packs have been released since the game's launch. These include the Arctic Pack, the South America Pack, the Australia Pack, the Aquatic Pack, the Southeast Asia Animal Pack, the Africa Pack, the North America Animal Pack, the Europe Pack, the Wetlands Animal Pack, the Conservation Pack, the Twilight Pack, and the Grasslands Animal Pack - each adding new animals to take care of as well as new scenery pieces, terrain, foliage, and building designs based on the desired region. In conjunction with the paid DLC, Frontier has continued to support the game through free updates to the base game. In addition to patching and bug fixes, these free updates have included new content such as scenery items including foliage and building pieces, new menus for food quality and park rides, and new in-game mechanics like hereditable color variation, vending machines, educator animal talks, first person camera mode and animal underwater diving.

Reception

Planet Zoo received "generally positive reviews" according to review aggregator Metacritic. It was praised for its attention to detail, graphics, heavily-researched animal behavior, robust build tools, in-depth management and economy system, and educational value regarding wildlife conservation. Drawing from Planet Coaster, the game was construed as offering players unparalleled flexibility and scope to design a zoological park unbound by creativity relative to previous zoo-based simulation games. IGN described the game as "widely satisfying" and "wowed with a huge amount of customization." Destructoid praised it as successfully capturing the spirit of Zoo Tycoon and many reviews have characterized it as the finest zoo management game of its time, with Kotaku calling it "one of gaming's great sandboxes".

However, these features also drew criticism for a steep learning curve and requiring a heavy attention to management; many reviewers considered this potentially off-putting to casual players who may be primarily interested in the animals over broader elements of park management. Although highly complex and detailed structures may be designed from scratch, the building mechanics and pathing system in particular have been described as being very difficult for new players to execute properly, especially for those who had not previously played Planet Coaster. Various guest, staff, and animal welfare mechanics have also been described as requiring an at times overwhelming degree of micromanagement. GameSpot described the game as a "spreadsheet safari" which "sometimes stumbles under the weight of its own systems", while GameInformer concluded that "an unreasonable level of patience [...] creates a barrier around its best qualities."

Reception to post-launch support and updates has been positive, with several attempts to address ongoing criticisms of the management and building systems. The introduction of new animals and set pieces has been highly positive, although some players have advocated for increasing the number of additional animals per DLC pack. Planet Zoo has adopted an approach of releasing smaller, more frequent content packs in contrast to the larger expansion packs of the original Zoo Tycoon series. In response to this feedback, the fourth expansion pack, the Southeast Asia Animal Pack, was released with 8 animals; the developers also made rapid modifications to the incoming binturong model after fans identified inaccurate anatomy in pre-release screenshots.

The game had sold more than a million copies by May 2020. It won the awards for "Best Simulation Game" at Gamescom 2019 and "Best Strategy/Simulation Game" at the 2020 Webby Awards. Additionally, it was nominated for "Best British Game" at the 16th British Academy Games Awards

References

External links

2019 video games
Business simulation games
Frontier Developments games
Single-player video games
Video games developed in the United Kingdom
Windows games
Windows-only games
Video games set in zoos
Video games about animals
Video games with downloadable content
Video games with Steam Workshop support